The Big Zane Theory is the second album by rapper, Zane (formerly Lil' Zane). It was released on August 19, 2003 through Priority Records. The album failed to match the success of Zane's previous album, as it charted at #191 on the Billboard 200s chart  with  6,423 copies sold the first week. The album also charted at #39 on the Top R&B/Hip-Hop Albums.The only single that was released on the album was "Tonite, I'm Yours" which peaked at # 87 on the Hot R&B/Hip-Hop Songs.To date the album sold close to 40,000 copies.

Track listing

Singles
"Tonite I'm Yours" (featuring Tank)

Chart positions

References 

2003 albums
Lil Zane albums
Priority Records albums